The following is the final results of the Iran Super League 2001/02 basketball season.

Regular season

Group A

Group B

Playoffs

Championship

Classification 5th–8th

Classification 9th–12th

Final standing

 Zob Ahan and Sanam qualified to WABA Champions Cup 2003.
 Rah Ahan and TB Fars relegated to Division 1.

References
 Final ranking

External links
 Asia-Basket
 iranbasketball.org

Iranian Basketball Super League seasons
League
Iran